Guy III is the third and most recent studio album from American R&B group Guy, released January 25, 2000 on MCA Records. The album reached number five on the R&B Albums chart and peaked at number thirteen on the Billboard 200 chart.

Background
The origins of Guy III started as far back as 1995, when the trio reunited to record the song "Tell Me What You Like" for the soundtrack to the Fox television series New York Undercover. The recording prompted the group to record another album. While recording in Trinidad, the album plans came to a halt when lead singer Aaron Hall refused to record the song "No Diggity", which would end up becoming a huge hit for Teddy Riley's second group Blackstreet the following year. The group reunited for a second time in 1999, recording the song "The Best" for the soundtrack to the Will Smith film Wild Wild West.

At the time of its release, not all of the members were on the same page for the release of Guy III. Founding member Teddy Riley remained hopeful that his group Blackstreet would record another album despite the friction between him and group member Chauncey Hannibal. Aaron Hall insisted on recording another solo album, while his brother Damion Hall was interested in an acting career. However, in a 2012 interview with Vibe Magazine, Riley blamed the failure of the album on the label. In the interview, he said:

"We tried to do a Guy reunion album. But I don’t think the record company did the third album any justice. MCA didn’t really get us at that point. And they were promoting us like we were jazz artists. They took us everywhere else, but to our audience. You have to know your demographics for that group. They didn’t get us on BET like they were supposed to. They were trying to get us on VH-1, but they weren’t checking for us. We had our radio record, ‘Dancin’’, that couldn’t get on BET. It was just a failure."

Their reunion turned out to be short-lived. By the time they released the second single "Why You Wanna Keep Me From My Baby", Riley left the group again. Only Aaron and Damion appeared in the video for the song. In an ironic twist on the album, a few of the songs were co-produced by Walter "Mucho" Scott and Daryl "Dezo" Adams. The two men were former members of Basic Black, a group discovered by Riley's former mentor/manager Gene Griffin a decade earlier. Guy initially derided the group as being copycats on the song "Gotta Be A Leader"- a song from Guy's second album The Future.

Release and reception

Guy III reached number five on the R&B Albums chart and peaked at number thirteen on the U.S. Billboard 200 chart.

Keith Farley of AllMusic stated that "Guy III equals the extraordinary expectations that any new material from Guy provokes, occasionally exceeding their work in the past."

Track listing

Chart history

Weekly charts

Year-end charts

Personnel
Information taken from Allmusic.
art direction – Drew FitzGerald
assistant engineering – Joe Woods
design – Drew FitzGerald
engineering – George Mayers, Julian McBrowne, Teddy Riley, Franz Verna
executive production – Teddy Riley
management - Life of Riley Entertainment & Erik "E Smooth" Hicks (Information taken from Billboard® magazine)
guitar – Richard Williams
hair stylist – Karim Oarnge
make-up – Karim Oarnge
mastering – Herb Powers
mixing – George Mayers, Julian McBrowne, Teddy Riley, Franz Verna
photography – Norman Jean Roy
production – Edward "DJ Eddie F" Ferrell, Aaron Hall, Damion Hall, Wesley Hodges, Darrin Lightly, Rich Lightning, Darryl Marshall, Walter "Mucho" Scott, Leon F. Sylvers III, Eric Williams
stylist – June Ambrose
vocals – Joi'e Chancellor, Aaron Hall, Damion Hall, Markell Riley, Teddy Riley
vocals (background) – Darryl Adams, Terrell Burnside, Delvis Damon, Guy, Aaron Hall, Damion Hall, Kazual, Clifton Lightly III, Veronica McKenzie, Balewa Muhammad, Terrell Phillips, Teddy Riley, Jaamal Smith, Leon F. Sylvers III, Eric Williams, Michael Woolard

Notes

External links
 
 Guy III at Discogs

2000 albums
Guy (band) albums
MCA Records albums
Albums produced by Teddy Riley
Albums produced by Leon Sylvers III
Albums produced by Eddie F